Britta Dahm (born 21 September 1968) is a retired German breaststroke swimmer who won a bronze medal in the 4 × 100 m medley relay at the 1987 European Aquatics Championships. She also competed in the 100 m and 200 m breaststroke and 4 × 100 m medley relay events at the 1988 Summer Olympics, and her team finished seventh in the relay.

References

1968 births
Living people
German female swimmers
Olympic swimmers of West Germany
Swimmers at the 1988 Summer Olympics
Female breaststroke swimmers
Sportspeople from Duisburg
European Aquatics Championships medalists in swimming